The 1972–73 season was the third season of the Portland Trail Blazers in the National Basketball Association (NBA). After finishing the previous season at 18–64, the Blazers earned the first overall selection in the 1972 NBA Draft, and infamously picked LaRue Martin over future Hall-of-Famer Bob McAdoo.  LaRue would average seven points per game over a four-season NBA career.
The Blazers finished at 21–61, a marginal three-game improvement from the previous season.

Draft picks

Note:  This is not a complete list; only the first two rounds are covered, as well as any other picks by the franchise who played at least one NBA game.

Roster

Regular season

Season standings

z – clinched division title
y – clinched division title
x – clinched playoff spot

Record vs. opponents

Game log

Player statistics

Awards and honors
 Sidney Wicks, NBA All-Star
 Lloyd Neal, NBA All-Rookie Team 1st Team

Transactions
 July 31, 1972 – Traded a second round pick in the 1973 NBA draft to the Philadelphia 76ers in exchange for forward Fred Foster, who was traded again that day by the Trail Blazers to the Detroit Pistons in exchange for guard-forward Terry Dischinger.
 September 11, 1972 – Waived forwards Ron Knight and Jim Marsh and received a second round pick in the 1974 NBA Draft from the Philadelphia 76ers as compensation for signing veteran free agent forward Gary Gregor.
 September 19, 1972 – Waived guard Charlie Yelverton
 October 2, 1972 – Traded center Dale Schlueter to the Philadelphia 76ers in exchange for guard Dave Wohl.
 October 10, 1972 – Claimed forward Bill Turner off waivers from the Golden State Warriors.
 October 24, 1972 – Traded a third round pick in the 1974 NBA Draft to the Cleveland Cavaliers in exchange for guard Charlie Davis.
 October 27, 1972 – Traded guard-forward Stan McKenzie (basketball) to the Houston Rockets in exchange for guard-forward Greg Smith
 November 13, 1972 – Waived forward Bill Turner
 December 6, 1972 – Waived guard Dave Wohl, who was claimed by the Buffalo Braves
 April 24, 1973 – Traded a first round and third round pick in the 1973 NBA Draft to the Cleveland Cavaliers in exchange for forward John Johnson and forward-center Rick Roberson and a first round pick in the 1973 NBA Draft.
 June 21, 1973 – Guard-forward Terry Dischinger retired
 June 27, 1973 – Signed free agent guard Bernie Fryer
Transactions from Sports Reference

References

Portland
Portland Trail Blazers seasons
Portland Trail Blazers 1972
Portland Trail Blazers 1972
Portland Trail Blazers
Portland Trail Blazers